The Federal Detention Center, SeaTac (FDC SeaTac) is a prison operated by the Federal Bureau of Prisons. The facility is also adjacent to the Angle Lake light rail station.

The administrative facility employed 200 staff as of 2002 and housed 608 male and female inmates as of March 23, 2015.

Background

Opened in September 1997, the detention center was designed for a capacity of 1000 inmates. The facility houses sentenced inmates, both male and female, as well as pre-trial, holdover, and immigration detainees. Many are involved in federal court proceedings in the Western District of Washington.

Procedures
Inmates are issued a "standard bed roll" consisting of bedding and towels upon arrival. Once assigned to a unit, inmates are estimated for size, provided clothes, and issued an identification card that must be carried at all times except to and from showers.

Death of Roxanna Brown

Roxanna Brown, the director of the Southeast Asian Ceramics Museum, died in a cell at the detention center on May 14, 2008. She had been arrested on May 9 for alleged wire fraud upon her arrival in the United States to give a lecture at an Asian art symposium at the University of Washington. The charge was dropped immediately after her death at the facility.

A medical malpractice lawsuit was filed by her son Taweesin Jaime Ngerntongdee after it was determined that Brown died of peritonitis caused by a perforated ulcer. The suit claimed that she had suffered stomach problems in the detention center and other inmates took her to a shower after a guard did not respond when she vomited something that "smelled like excrement." When Brown called for help after the 10 p.m. lockdown on May 13, the guard told her that she would have to wait until the morning for medical attention, according to the suit. Detention center officials acknowledged that there was no overnight medical staff on duty and took the case to mediation. The federal government settled the case for $880,000 in July 2009. Attorney Tim Ford stated that part of the settlement stipulated that Brown's death would be investigated by the Federal Bureau of Prisons.

Prosecutor murder plot
The Federal Bureau of Prisons filed a request on June 16, 2009, to transfer Clayton Roueche of the United Nations gang from SeaTac to the U.S. Penitentiary in Marion, Illinois, after the discovery of an alleged plot with fellow inmate Luke Elliott Sommer to kill three federal prosecutors and the warden of the detention center. Roueche was eventually transferred to the U.S. Penitentiary in Lee County, Virginia.

Notable inmates (current and former)

See also

List of U.S. federal prisons
Federal Bureau of Prisons
Incarceration in the United States

References

External links
FDC SeaTac at the Federal Bureau of Prisons (Official site)
FDC SeaTac at InsidePrison.com
Ngerntongdee v. United States of America at Justia.com

Buildings and structures in King County, Washington
Prisons in Washington (state)
SeaTac
SeaTac, Washington
1997 establishments in Washington (state)